Charles William Grant (25 April 1878 – 14 December 1943) was an Australian politician.

Born in Hobart, Tasmania, he was educated at Hutchins School before becoming a merchant and later a magistrate. In 1922 he was elected to the Tasmanian House of Assembly as a Nationalist member for Denison. He left the Assembly in 1925, when he was appointed to the Australian Senate as a Nationalist Senator for Tasmania, filling the casual vacancy caused by the death of Senator George Foster.

Defeated in 1925, he returned to the House of Assembly for Denison in 1928, serving until 1932 as an Honorary Minister. He was appointed again as a Tasmanian Senator, this time for the United Australia Party, in 1932 after the death of James Ogden. He remained in the Senate until his retirement in 1940.

Grant died in 1943, in the same house he was born in on Davey Street, Hobart.

References

1878 births
1943 deaths
Nationalist Party of Australia members of the Parliament of Australia
United Australia Party members of the Parliament of Australia
Members of the Australian Senate for Tasmania
Members of the Australian Senate
Members of the Tasmanian House of Assembly
20th-century Australian politicians